B. exigua may refer to:

 Balearica exigua, an extinct crane
 Boa exigua, a South American snake
 Bolbula exigua, a praying mantis
 Brocchinia exigua, a sea snail
 Bromelia exigua, a flowering plant